Jason DeRocco (born 19 September 1989) is a Canadian male volleyball player. He was part of the Canada men's national volleyball team. On club level he played for Jastrzębski Węgiel.

Sporting achievements

Clubs

National championship
 2016/2017  Polish Championship, with Jastrzębski Węgiel

National Team
 2017  FIVB World League

 2020 EASHL Playoff MVP with DEER LAKE RED WINGS (5 Goals, 3 Assists)

References

External links
 profile at FIVB.org

Place of birth missing (living people)
Canadian men's volleyball players
1989 births
Living people
Expatriate volleyball players in Poland
Jastrzębski Węgiel players